The 2022–23 Czech Extraliga season is the 30th season of the Czech Extraliga since its creation after the breakup of Czechoslovakia and the Czechoslovak First Ice Hockey League in 1993.

Regular season

Standings
Each team played 52 games, playing each of the other 13 teams four times – twice at home, and twice away. Points were awarded for each game, where three points were awarded for winning in regulation time, two points for winning in overtime or shootout, one point for losing in overtime or shootout, and zero points for losing in regulation time. At the end of the regular season, the team that finished with the most points was crowned the league champion.

Statistics

Scoring leaders

The following shows the top ten players who led the league in points, at the conclusion of the regular season.

Leading goaltenders
The following shows the top ten goaltenders who led the league in goals against average, provided that they have played at least 40% of their team's minutes, at the conclusion of the regular season.

Relegation series
Relegation series played between TEAM, the 14th team in regular season, and TEAM, the winner of 1. Liga winners. The winner of the best-of-seven series would play in the 2023–24 Czech Extraliga.

Playoffs
Twelve teams qualify for the playoffs: the top four teams in the regular season have a bye to the quarterfinals, while teams ranked fifth to twelfth meet each other (5 versus 12, 6 versus 11, 7 versus 10, 8 versus 9) in a preliminary playoff round.

Bracket

Wild card round

Quarterfinals

Semifinals

Finals

Final rankings

References

External links
Official website

Czech Extraliga seasons
Czech
2022–23 in Czech ice hockey leagues